The Nolynn Baptist Church is a historic Southern Baptist church in Hodgenville, Kentucky.  It is located on Kentucky Route 222 southeast of its junction with McCubbin-Harned Rd.  It was built in 1810 and added to the National Register of Historic Places in 1991.

It is a one-story, front-gable, three-bay church built in 1895.  It is surrounded on three sides by a cemetery with more than 200 grave sites, with the oldest dated 1810.

References

Baptist churches in Kentucky
Churches on the National Register of Historic Places in Kentucky
Churches completed in 1895
National Register of Historic Places in LaRue County, Kentucky
Southern Baptist Convention churches
1895 establishments in Kentucky
Romanesque Revival architecture in Kentucky